KTXX-FM (104.9 MHz, "The Horn") is a commercial FM radio station licensed to Bee Cave, Texas, and serving the Greater Austin radio market. The station broadcasts a sports radio format and is owned by Genuine Austin Radio. KTXX-FM's transmitter is located on State Highway 71 on the west side of Austin. The station has studios and offices along Loop 360 in Southwest Austin.

KTXX-FM broadcasts in the HD Radio format.  Its HD3 digital subchannel simulcasts the progressive country format heard on co-owned 99.3 KOKE-FM.  The HD4 subchannel airs a classic hits sound, known as "The Bat," which feeds FM translator 105.3 K287FG.  In addition, most of KTXX-FM's sports programming is heard on sister station AM 1260 KTAE in Taylor and its translator, 101.9 K270CO Round Rock.

Programming
KTXX-FM calls itself "The Horn," referring to the Texas Longhorns. It is the flagship station for the University of Texas at Austin sports teams. KTXX-FM carries local sports shows during the day and airs programming from Houston-based SportsMap on nights and weekends.

History

KFFQ and KLKM
The station first signed on in 1984 as KFFQ, playing country music. It was originally licensed to Llano and was owned by Duane Fox.

In 1988, it was acquired by Maxagrid Broadcasting, which switched 104.9 to a beautiful music format as KLKM. Around 2000, the station changed its city of license to Dripping Springs, Texas and became "Digital 104.9" KXXS. In July 1998, after being at 104.7 FM as KBAE FM, 104.9 FM entered the Austin market as a religious formatted station.

104.9 The Beat
In February 2007, that format and call sign moved to 92.5, to make room for rhythmic contemporary station KXBT as "Beat 104.9". This was the third incarnation of "The Beat", which originally launched on 104.3 in 1998 as KQBT, although it later adopted the KXBT call letters on the same frequency after six months. The format moved from 104.3 due to a change in ownership when Entercom sold the frequency to Univision. The staff and lineup from "The Beat" was still intact, even though new owner Entercom let them go. They were hired by Border Media Partners (BMP).

On September 26, 2008, BMP announced that KXBT will flip to Spanish Contemporary. On September 29, 2008, KXBT became a simulcast of KXXS. This allowed the station to be heard around Greater Austin, with KXBT serving the western portion and KXXS covering the eastern part of the market. The simulcast was called "Digital 104.9 y 92.5". The "Digital" simulcast was broken up in mid-2009, when 104.9 flipped to Regional Mexican. The Spanish Contemporary format was retained on 92.5. "The Beat" aired on 105.9 KFMK and later 102.3 KPEZ.

Sports radio
On November 2, 2009, the format changed to all-sports, and was branded as "104.9 The Horn". The brand is a tribute to the University of Texas at Austin sports teams, the Texas Longhorns. At first, KTXX-FM aired local sports shows and carried ESPN Radio programming nights and weekends.

On January 2, 2014, the ESPN Radio programming was dropped. KTXX-FM became a hybrid of sports talk and classic hits. Morning and afternoon drive time, as well as the noon hour, remained local sports talk, while the other non-sporting event hours became classic hits. On May 5, 2014, more sports talk was added. The schedule had sports talk from 6am to 7pm and classic hits the rest of the day, unless a sporting event or specialty program was being broadcast.

In February 2015, The Horn dropped the classic hits portion of its format and began airing sports full-time with NBC Sports Radio programming heard nights and weekends, and NBC Sports updates during the day.  NBC Sports was later replaced with SB Nation Radio (now SportsMap), based in Houston. KTXX-FM's city of license was switched to Bee Cave, Texas, although its studios and transmitter remain in Austin.

On June 16, 2015, KTXX-FM became the flagship station of the Texas Longhorns.

References

External links

TXX-FM
Sports radio stations in the United States
Radio stations established in 1985
1985 establishments in Texas